Gymnopilus underwoodii is a species of agaric fungus in the family Hymenogastraceae. Originally described in 1896 by Charles Peck as Flammula underwoodii, the fungus was given its current name by William Murrill in 1917. The specific epithet honors American mycologist Lucien Underwood.

Description

Habitat and distribution
Gymnopilus underwoodii has been found on pine logs and trunks. It is found in the US, from Virginia to Alabama and in Florida, fruiting from November to December.

See also

List of Gymnopilus species

References

underwoodii
Fungi described in 1917
Fungi of North America
Taxa named by Charles Horton Peck